Hymenopappus radiatus, the ray hymenopappus, is a North American species of flowering plant in the daisy family.

It is endemic to the state of Arizona, in the southwestern United States.

Description
One plant produces 6-8 flower heads per stem, each head 8 white ray flowers surrounding 30–50 yellow disc flowers.

References

radiatus
Flora of Arizona
Endemic flora of the United States
Plants described in 1891
Flora without expected TNC conservation status